Events from the year 1431 in France

Incumbents
 Monarch – Charles VII

Events
 21 February – The trial of Joan of Arc for heresy begins in Rouen.
 30 May – Having been found guilty Joan of Arc is executed
 16 December – Henry VI of England is crowned King of France at Notre-Dame de Paris
 Unknown – The University of Poitiers is founded.

Births
 François Villon, poet (died c.1463)

Deaths
 Charles II, Duke of Lorraine (born 1364)
 Joan of Arc (born c.1412)
 Arnaud Guillaume de Barbazan, soldier (born 1360)

References

1430s in France